50th Birthday Concert is a double CD live album by British saxophonist and improviser Evan Parker recorded  at Dingwalls in 1993 and released on the English Leo label.

Reception

AllMusic awarded the album 4½ stars with reviewer Steve Loewy stating:
 
The Penguin Guide to Jazz awarded the album a "Crown" signifying a recording that the authors "feel a special admiration or affection for".

Track listing

Personnel
Evan Parker – soprano saxophone, tenor saxophone 
Alexander von Schlippenbach - piano (Disc One)
Barry Guy - bass (Disc Two)
Paul Lovens (Disc One), Paul Lytton (Disc Two) - percussion

References

Leo Records live albums
Evan Parker live albums
1994 live albums